Kazakhstan competed in the Junior Eurovision Song Contest 2022 in Armenia, which was held on 11 December 2022 in Yerevan. The Kazakh broadcaster Khabar Agency (KA) selected its representative via children's contest Baqytty Bala.

Background 

Prior to the 2022 contest, Kazakhstan's highest placing in the contest was in 2019 and 2020, represented by Yerzhan Maxim with the song "Armanyńnan qalma" and Karakat Bashanova with the song "Forever", respectively, both achieving second place.

As Khabar Agency (KA) is not an active member of the European Broadcasting Union (EBU), the broadcaster requires a special invitation from the EBU to participate in Eurovision events. Channel 31 had previously expressed their ambitions to debut in the 2018 contest, and had sent a delegation to the  contest.

Before Junior Eurovision

Baqytty Bala 2022 
Kazakhstan's participation in the 2022 contest was confirmed in August 2022, having been invited to participate by the European Broadcasting Union (EBU). Together with the confirmation of participation, it was announced the competing artist would be selected during the international children's contest Baqytty Bala. 21 artists from 8 countries were selected to participate in the shows in Aktobe. Due to the fact not all participants fit the rules of participation at Junior Eurovision, the nomination to represent Kazakhstan wasn't awarded automatically to one of the winners. The results were determined by a jury consisting of Askhat Mayemirov (director), Marat Aitimov (music teacher), Qanat Aitbayev (founder of Baqytty Bala), Rukhiya Baydukenova (singer) and Yernar Nurtazin (pianist). On 13 August 2022, David Charlin was ultimately chosen to represent the country after the final night of the contest.

Song selection 
In a press conference held in early October vice-president of the Kazakh broadcaster, Daniyar Menilbekov, revealed that the Kazakh entry has been internally selected and will be revealed at a later date. The Kazakh entry, "Jer-Ana (Mother Earth)", written by Khamit Shangaliyev, Serzhan Bakhitzhan and Jordan Arakelyan, was presented to the public on 6 November 2022, accompanied by an official music video.

At Junior Eurovision 
After the opening ceremony, which took place on 5 December 2022, it was announced that Kazakhstan would perform third on 11 December 2022, following Poland and preceding Malta.

At the end of the contest, David Charlin received 47 points, placing Kazakhstan 15th out 16 participating countries. This is the lowest result Kazakhstan had achieved since it first entered the contest.

Voting

Detailed voting results

References 

Kazakhstan
2022
Junior Eurovision Song Contest